Kiss×sis is an anime adaptation of the manga series created by Bow Ditama and animated by Feel. The series revolves around a boy named Keita Suminoe who finds himself the centre of attention of his twin step-sisters, Ako and Riko. The anime adaptation consists of two series: a twelve-episode anime television series and a twelve-part original video animation (OVA) series. The first OVA was released on December 22, 2008, with subsequent episodes released with volumes of the manga until April 6, 2015. The anime television series aired on AT-X between April 5, 2010 and June 21, 2010, and was released on DVD from June 23, 2010.

Episodes

OVA

References

Kissxsis